Kotowice may refer to:

Kotowice, Głogów County in Lower Silesian Voivodeship (south-west Poland)
Kotowice, Trzebnica County in Lower Silesian Voivodeship (south-west Poland)
Kotowice, Wrocław County in Lower Silesian Voivodeship (south-west Poland)
Kotowice, Łódź Voivodeship (central Poland)
Kotowice, Masovian Voivodeship (east-central Poland)
Kotowice, Silesian Voivodeship (south Poland)
Kotowice, Lubusz Voivodeship (west Poland)